Jacob Neestrup Hansen (born 8 March 1988) is a Danish professional football manager and former player who is the manager of Danish Superliga club F.C. Copenhagen.

A former midfielder, Neestrup emerged from the FC Copenhagen youth academy, but saw his career mostly diminished due to injuries. After retiring in 2011, he embarked on a career in management. He was appointed head coach of second-tier 1st Division club Viborg in June 2019, after having worked as an assistant at Copenhagen the season before.

Career
Although his first team debut came on 20 September 2006 in the Danish Cup, he was not promoted to the first team before the summer 2007. He was injured only two minutes into his professional debut. The injury subsequently ruled him out for 8 months.

After recovering, Neestrup made his Danish Superliga debut in the last match of the 2006–07 season against Vejle Boldklub.

In May 2010, Neestrup was signed by reigning Icelandic champions FH Hafnarfjörður. His stint with the club was not successful, being sidelined for large parts of the season due to injuries and a car accident. After six months, he returned to Denmark to sign with fourth-tier Denmark Series club Fremad Amager.

Coaching career
On 20 June 2019, it was confirmed that Neestrup had been appointed as the manager of Viborg FF for the upcoming season.

On 22 December 2020, it was announced that Neestrup would leave Viborg at the end of the year and return to F.C. Copenhagen as assistant manager of Jess Thorup. He left Viborg in 1st place in the 2020-21 Danish 1st Division.

On 20 September 2022, he was announced as new manager of F.C. Copenhagen following the sacking of Jess Thorup.

Managerial statistics

Honours
Danish Superliga: 2008–09
Danish Cup: 2008–09

References

External links
 F.C. København profile
Danish national team profile

1988 births
Living people
Danish men's footballers
F.C. Copenhagen players
Danish Superliga players
Association football midfielders
Expatriate footballers in Iceland
Denmark Series players
Fremad Amager players
Danish expatriate sportspeople in Iceland
Danish expatriate men's footballers
Kjøbenhavns Boldklub players
Stavanger IF players
Fimleikafélag Hafnarfjarðar players
Úrvalsdeild karla (football) players
Norwegian First Division players
Viborg FF managers
Expatriate footballers in Norway
Danish expatriate sportspeople in Norway
Footballers from Copenhagen
Denmark youth international footballers
Danish football managers
F.C. Copenhagen non-playing staff
Danish 1st Division managers